100 Landscapes of Japan may refer to:
 100 Landscapes of Japan (Shōwa era)
 100 Landscapes of Japan (Heisei era)